Kelly Murphy (born October 20, 1989) is an American indoor volleyball player for the United States women's national volleyball team. Murphy played collegiate volleyball with the University of Florida Gators from 2008 to 2011. Murphy won gold with the national team at the 2014 World Championship and bronze at the 2016 Rio Olympic Games.

Personal life
Born to Scott and Sandy Murphy in the Chicago metropolitan area suburb of Wilmington, Illinois, Kelly was raised with her two  sisters, Jennifer and Mary. Murphy would attend Joliet Catholic Academy in nearby Joliet, Illinois, where she began being recruited by college volleyball coaches in her freshman year. She was considered to be the nation's top high school recruit in her class and was named National Gatorade High School Player of the Year her senior year.

College
Murphy played college women's volleyball at University of Florida.  In her freshman season in 2008, Murphy made Florida history, as she was named the program's first ever AVCA National Freshman of the Year. In addition, she was named the SEC Freshman of the Year as well as the AVCA South Region Freshman of the Year and set the school record for career triple-doubles. She also became Florida's first ever freshman to earn SEC Player of the Week honors. As a sophomore in 2009, Murphy was named a Second Team All-American and was also an unanimous first Team All-SEC pick. In her junior year playing for Florida, Murphy  was named a First Team All-American and earned SEC Player of the Year.  Murphy finished her career seventh in University of Florida history in sets played (447), eighth in kills (1,306), 12th in attacks (2,729), eighth in assists (2,671), 10th in service aces (126), 14th in digs (959), 20th in block assists (253), and 10th in points (1,567.5) while registering school record 30 career triple-doubles and 76 career double-doubles.

International
Murphy was part of the U.S. national team that won the 2014 World Championship gold medal when their team defeated China 3-1 in the final match. In 2016, Murphy played for the United States women's national volleyball team that won an Olympic bronze medal in Rio de Janeiro.  In 2018, she was part of the USA's World Championship team which finished fifth overall. Also, Murphy played professionally with clubs in Italy, Japan and China.  She was not one of the twelve players named to the 2020 Olympic team.

Awards

College
 2008 AVCA All-American Third Team
 2009 AVCA All-American Second Team
 2009 NCAA Division I women's volleyball tournament Gainesville regional All-Tournament Team
 2010 AVCA All-American First Team
 2011 AVCA All-American First Team
 2011 NCAA Division I women's volleyball tournament Gainesville regional All-Tournament Team

Individual
 2007 Women's Junior Volleyball World Championship - Best Server
 2013 NORCECA Championship "Most Valuable Player"
 2013 NORCECA Championship "Best Opposite"
 2015 V.Premier League - Best Server

National team
 2013  Pan-American Volleyball Cup 	
 2013  NORCECA Championship 	
 2013  FIVB World Grand Champions Cup	
 2014  FIVB World Championship 	
 2015  FIVB World Grand Prix	
 2016  FIVB World Grand Prix
 2016  Summer Olympics
 2018  FIVB Volleyball Women's Nations League

References

External links
FIVB Biography
gatorzone.com – Kelly Murphy

1989 births
Living people
American women's volleyball players
People from Wilmington, Will County, Illinois
Florida Gators women's volleyball players
Opposite hitters
Volleyball players at the 2016 Summer Olympics
Olympic bronze medalists for the United States in volleyball
Medalists at the 2016 Summer Olympics
Expatriate volleyball players in Italy
Expatriate volleyball players in Japan
American expatriate sportspeople in Italy
American expatriate sportspeople in Japan
University of Florida alumni
Setters (volleyball)
Expatriate volleyball players in China
American expatriate sportspeople in China
Serie A1 (women's volleyball) players
21st-century American women